Iniya (இனியா) is a prime time Tamil-language family soap opera directed by Narayana Moorthy. The show premiered on 5 December 2022 on Sun TV and is available for worldwide streaming on Sun NXT. Produced by Saregama the series stars Alya Manasa and Rishi in the lead roles. It is being 
telecasted in the prime time slot of 9:00 pm (IST). It has good response from viewers and is highly praised.

Synopsis
Iniya tells the story of a girl who faces Male-chauvinistic cop Vikram (Rishi) marries an open-minded and confident Iniya (Alya Manasa) to teach her a hard lesson, while Iniya's forced to tie the knot out of love for her sister and their mother's dying wish. What's waiting for Iniya in the new chapter of her life?

Cast

Main
 Alya Manasa as Iniya Vikram
 A supportive yet bold person. Thiruvasagam’s youngest daughter and Yazhini’s younger sister. Vikram's wife. 
 Rishi as Vikraman (Vikram) Nallasivam
 A stubbon and arrogant person. Nallasivam's elder son and Elango and Akshaya's brother. Iniya's husband

Supporting 
 Mansi Joshi as Yazhini Elango: Iniya's elder sister and Elango's wife
 Deepak Kumar as Elangovan (Elango) Nallasivam: Vikram's younger brother and Yazhini's husband
 Praveena as Gowri Nallasivam: Vikram, Elangovan and Akshaya's mother
 L. Raja as Nallasivam: Vikram, Elangovan and Akshaya's father
 Preetha Reddy as Akshaya Nallasivam: Vikram and Elangovan's younger sister
 Santhana Bharathi as Thiruvasagam: Yazhini and Iniya's father
 Lailaa as Sonali Rajesh: Iniya's friend
 Mahesh Praba as Subash
 Jayshri Jue as Meena: Dhanam's daughter
 Kavitha Solairaja as Dhanam: Nallasivam's first younger sister
 Sai Madhavi as Amudhavalli: Nallasivam's second younger sister
 Ramya Srinivasan as Swetha: Amudhavalli's daughter
 Udumalai Ravi as Chidambaram
 Akbar as Sandeep: Vikram's friend and Sonali's Ex-fiancé
 Uma Padmanabhan as Lakshmi Tiruvasagam: Yazhini and Iniya's mother (Deceased)
 Richhi as Rajesh: Sonali's husband (Deceased)

Special Appearances 
 Vadivukkarasi as Periya Aachi

Production

Casting
Alya Manasa
 was cast in the female lead role as Iniya. Actor Rishi who plays the male lead role as Vikram, who making his come back after 6 years. Praveena was cast as supporting role who already worked with Alya in Raja Rani 2. Santhana Bharathi plays a father role of Iniya, L. Raja  plays a father role of Vikram. Besides Deepak, Mansa and Preetha were cast then.

Release
The show premiered on Sun TV on 5 December 2022. The show  replaced Roja.

References

Sun TV original programming
2022 Tamil-language television series debuts
Television shows set in Tamil Nadu
Tamil-language melodrama television series
Tamil-language romance television series
Tamil-language television soap operas
Tamil-language television shows